Loose Talk was a Pakistani television comedy show that was first aired on ARY Digital in June 2002. The show was a social and political commentary delivered humorously to reach the masses. It was written and created by Anwar Maqsood. The satire-comedy talk show was loosely inspired by BBC World Service's HARDTalk.

In November 2019, a clip from the show went viral and led to the resurgence of the show's popularity in India and Pakistan.

Format 
Each episode featured Anwar Maqsood as the host and Moin Akhter as a guest impersonating hundreds of different personalities including Saddam Hussein (episode 26), Abdul Sattar Edhi (episode 276), former Prime Minister of India Manmohan Singh (episode 298), Sushma Swaraj, Javed Miandad, a harmonium player, a Christian nurse, a transgender woman, and a single mother. Bushra Ansari also starred in several episodes (2, 8, 13, 17, 189).

Reception 
The show was immensely popular in Pakistan when it first aired. The then President Pervez Musharraf admitted to being a fan.

In November 2019, an extract from an episode in which Moin Akhter impersonates a harmonium player and exchanges humorous barbs with Anwer Maqsood went viral in South Asia. The short clip led to the creation of a popular meme template featuring Moin Akhter himself. The full episode on the official YouTube channel of Loose Talk has amassed nearly 30 million views (as of May 2021), the majority of which accrued in late 2019 when the show's popularity exploded in India and Pakistan.

In February 2020, Indian food delivery start-up Zomato used the internet meme to mock its own marketing campaign.

References

External links

Pakistani television shows
Urdu-language television shows
Pakistani comedy television series